Ampittia virgata is a species of butterfly in the family Hesperiidae. It was described by John Henry Leech in 1890. It is found in China and Taiwan. Its wingspan is 30–32 mm. Cell of forewing beneath yellow with a black streak in the centre.

Subspecies
 Ampittia virgata virgata (Leech, 1890) (China)
 Ampittia virgata miyakei Matsumura, 1910 (Taiwan)

References

Butterflies described in 1890
Ampittia
Butterflies of Asia